Edwin Diller Starbuck  born Edwin Eli Starbuck (20 February 1866 – 18 November 1947) was an American educational psychologist who took a special interest in the teaching of morals and character in children independent of religious instruction. His idea was to imbue morals through indirect means where students would learn by inference.

Starbuck was the son of Luzena Jessup and Samuel, Quaker farmers in Guilford Township, Hendricks County, Indiana. He grew up skeptical of orthodox Christian beliefs and took an early interest in evolution. He graduated in philosophy at Indiana University in 1890 and joined Harvard to study philosophy, religion and psychology, receiving a degree in 1895. He conducted surveys of religious belief and conversion using questionnaires along with G. Stanley Hall at Clark University and published several papers of his findings. He later published the book Psychology of Religion (1899) and also contributed to the work of William James' Varieties of Religious Experience (1902).  He became an assistant professor of education at Leland Stanford Junior University. In 1903 he worked with Ernst Meumann at the University of Zurich. He worked in Earlham College from 1904 to 1906 before he moved to the University of Iowa. He moved to the University of Southern California in 1930 and remained there until his retirement. He pioneered the empirical study of religion through questionnaire surveys.

He married Anna Maria Diller, a Harvard classmate, in 1895 and they had eight children. He later changed his middle name to Diller.

References

External links 
 Biographical Dictionary of Iowa
 The psychology of religion (1911)
 Harvard class of 1895

Educational psychologists
1866 births
1947 deaths
Indiana University Bloomington alumni
Harvard University alumni
Clark University alumni
Stanford University faculty
Earlham College faculty
University of Iowa faculty
University of Southern California faculty